Ştefan Maimescu is a politician and journalist from the Republic of Moldova.

Biography 

In the 1980s, Ştefan Maimescu worked as a correspondent for the Gosteleradio. He served as member of the Parliament of Moldova (1990–1994).

External links 
 Cine au fost şi ce fac deputaţii primului Parlament din R. Moldova (1990-1994)?
 Declaraţia deputaţilor din primul Parlament
 Site-ul Parlamentului Republicii Moldova
 "Poem:colinda si blestem" de Stefan Maimescu! La restaurantul MOLDOVA de la Venezia.

References

Living people
Moldovan journalists
Male journalists
Moldovan activists
Moldovan MPs 1990–1994
Popular Front of Moldova MPs
Year of birth missing (living people)